Vinícius Kiss Silva Tobias (born June 8, 1988 in São Paulo), or simply Vinícius Kiss, is a Brazilian footballer who plays as a central midfielder.

Honours
Sampaio Corrêa
Campeonato Maranhense: 2020

References

External links
 Vinícius Kiss at playmakerstats.com (English version of ogol.com.br)

1988 births
Living people
Brazilian footballers
Campeonato Brasileiro Série B players
Campeonato Brasileiro Série C players
Campeonato Brasileiro Série D players
Cuiabá Esporte Clube players
Ipatinga Futebol Clube players
Tupi Football Club players
São Bernardo Futebol Clube players
Paraná Clube players
Associação Desportiva São Caetano players
Coritiba Foot Ball Club players
Esporte Clube São Bento players
Grêmio Novorizontino players
Sampaio Corrêa Futebol Clube players
Botafogo Futebol Clube (SP) players
Clube do Remo players
Figueirense FC players
Association football midfielders
Footballers from São Paulo